Mary Hall Surface (born June 15, 1958) is an American playwright and director of theater, working primarily in the Washington, D.C. area. Surface's work has focused primarily on youth and family content.  Surface has received accolades from critics for the inventive use of costumes and music mixed with classic storytelling, often with origins in folk tales. She has earned one Helen Hayes Award for Outstanding Direction of a Resident Musical - out of eight nominations. In addition, soundtrack of her musical The Odyssey of Telémaca co-written with composer David Maddox won the 2004 Parents' Choice Gold Award.

Career
In December 2008, Surface directed the world premiere of Alice, her own adaptation of the Lewis Carroll books, at Round House Theatre in Bethesda, Maryland.

Personal life
In 1987, she married her husband, Kevin Reese. 
They have one daughter, American YouTube personality, singer-songwriter and stage actress, Malinda Kathleen Reese.

Helen Hayes Awards

Recordings
"The Nightingale" (1999) – playwright with composer David Maddox.
"Sing Down The Moon: Appalachian Wonder Tales" (2002) – playwright with composer David Maddox.
"Perseus Bayou: The Search for the Cajun Medusa" (2002) – playwright with composer David Maddox.
"The Odyssey of Telémaca" (2004) – playwright with composer David Maddox.

Books
"Prodigy: Wolfgang Amadeus Mozart" (1988) – author. Published by Anchorage Press.
"The Sorcerer's Apprentice" (1994) – author. Published by Anchorage Press.
"Most Valuable Player and Four Other All-Star Plays for Middle and High School Audiences (Young Actors Series)" (1999) – author. Published by Smith & Kraus.
"Short Scenes and Monologues for Middle School Actors" (2000) – author. Published by Smith & Kraus.
"More Short Scenes and Monologues for Middle School Students: Inspired by Literature, Social Studies, and Real Life (Young Actor Series)" (2007) – author. Published by Smith & Kraus.
"Spirit Shall Fly" (2007) – author. Published by Anchorage Press.
"The Tales of the Custard Dragon" (2009) – co-author with Danny Whitman. Published by Samuel French.

Stage
Sing Down The Moon: Appalachian Wonder Tales  (2000) – Director and playwright, composed by David Maddox at Theater of the First Amendment (VA).

References

External links
Author's page at Plays for Young Audiences website
Alumni Association page from Centre College, Kentucky
Author's web page

1958 births
American theatre directors
Women theatre directors
Living people
American opera directors
Female opera directors
Centre College alumni
Writers from Bowling Green, Kentucky